Leila Mimmack (born 5 November 1993) is an English actress.

Early life
Mimmack was born on 5 November 1993 in Leamington Spa to parents Maddy Kerr and Peter Mimmack, who run the Heartbreak Productions theatre company in Spencer Yard, Leamington. Mimmack went to Stratford-upon-Avon College. During her eight year at school Mimmack's teacher described the destruction of the rainforest, which had a big effect on her. Mimmack later became a climate change campaigner and attended rallies and marches. When she was 19 she moved to a narrowboat moored in Hackney marshes, partly because of environmental reasons.

Career
Her first success as an actress came in 2008 when she won the "Best Teenage Actress" Award at the "Growing Talent Convention" in Paris, beating 300 competitors. Her first television appearance was in 2010 when she appeared in the BBC series Doctors as Vanessa Finch. In 2011, she played the werewolf Christa in the Being Human spin off Becoming Human. Furthermore, she could be seen in the mini series Mayday, as the May queen Hattie, who disappeared when she was cycling towards the May Day parade. She also appeared as a 17-year old Polish girl Dita in the television series Inside Men. In 2014 starred as the 19 year-old Brighton call-girl Blue in The Sleeping Room. In the same year she appeared as young Mary in Son of God.  In the British thriller Level Up she plays Anna who has been kidnapped by masked thugs. In 2015, she got the role of Laura Campbell in Home Fires, who has an affair with a married military officer. In 2020, she returned to Doctors in the recurring role of Tanya Rees.

Filmography

Theatre

References

External links
 

1993 births
Living people
People from Warwickshire
English film actresses
English stage actresses
English television actresses
21st-century English actresses
People from Leamington Spa